The Guerilla Open Access Manifesto is a document written by Aaron Swartz in 2008 that supports the Open Access movement. The goal of the Open Access movement is to remove barriers and paywalls that may prohibit the general public from accessing scientific research publications. Aaron Swartz, the creator of the Guerilla manifesto, was an activist who fought against the restrictions that were placed on scholarly articles and for the right of all people to have access to scientific research.

Historical context 
On January 1, 1983, ARPANET, which originally used NCP protocol, shifted to TCP/IP, paving the way for the modern internet. As the use of the internet and data transfer became widespread, the world entered an age of unprecedented ease of copying and transferring information. However, much information was still bounded under copyright laws. This discrepancy caused some to feel dissatisfaction in the lack of information availability, and leading to a desire to make information more accessible to the public.

Open access information was brought upon by the computer scientists, who shared their discoveries openly on the internet for other scientists to use as a foundation for continued work in the field. At this time, due to the lack of knowledge, this freely shared information was still limited to only a small scale community. As more communities became more accustomed to using the Internet, diverse sets of individuals from a variety of backgrounds – independent researchers, professional communities, industry and commerce – began to utilize and add onto this public database. At this point servers, arXiv7 and Citeseer8 being the two main collections featuring scientific publications, took root to meet the demand of open access information by researchers. Their use became widespread, and they set a precedent for literature publications in different fields.

Prior to the publication of the Manifesto, Swartz had been active in the open-source movement. During a trip to MIT after becoming a finalist for ArsDigita prize, Swartz was surrounded by tech professionals intent on making the internet open-source. Additionally, Swartz worked on other open-source projects prior to writing the Manifesto, such as working as an early contributor to Creative Commons, a web organization devoted to ensuring open access to a variety of different copyrighted materials. Other work includes his early programming contributions to Open Library, an organization attempting to create a comprehensive online library containing information on every book. Months before publishing the Manifesto, in 2008, Swartz worked to make thousands of federal court documents public for free.

Analysis of content 
The manifesto opens with the statement that "Information is Power", and makes the case that access to knowledge is a human right. It focuses on the availability of scientific and scholarly work online, and argues for the importance of making scholarly work widely available, along with removing existing barriers to access. The Manifesto identifies restrictions to information availability as a serious problem facing both the academic community and the world at large, and criticizes both the copyright laws that have led to paywalls, along with the corporate influences and perceived greed that have supported the development of legislature supporting this. In the Manifesto, Swartz mentions one publisher by name: Reed Elsevier, a publisher whose articles covering a breadth of topics are hidden behind a paywall, which Swartz condemns as unethical. He frames one of the goals of the Open Access Movement is to ensure that academics publishing their work can make it available to everyone and not be hindered by these restrictions. Additionally, Swartz addresses the role of privilege in impacting who does and does not have access to many of these information repositories, calling attention to existing socioeconomic divides that contribute to these inequities in information availability. The Manifesto serves as a call to action by Swartz, and argues that making scholarly information widely available online is a moral imperative. In order to do so, it advocates for proponents of open access to engage in civil disobedience and condones the violation of copyright law in order to make scholarly work widely available online.

Repercussions and impact 
The content of Swartz's manifesto quickly caught the attention of government entities. The open access movement was gaining traction as Swartz's initial attack on the JSTOR paywall had brought to light the injustices of blocking citizens from publicly funded research. In 2013, the U.S. Secret Service released a portion of their almost 15,000 page file on Swartz, detailing their investigation of his home and chronicling the questions asked of him about the Manifesto's "human rights" applications. Swartz was facing up to 50 years in prison if found guilty of the charges against him, and remained under investigation until his eventual suicide in 2013. The Manifesto and its ideas continued to spread online and databases such as JSTOR were under criticism for their inaccessible practices. In January 2012, thousands of scientists protested Elsevier, the publisher referenced within the Manifesto, for its practice of enforcing paywalls and limiting access.

Some activists claim that Swartz was unsuccessful in achieving the specific goals he outlined in his Manifesto. The JSTOR collection was not released to public domain, and other activists spoke out against the illegal activities the Manifesto supported. However, the symbolic ideas Swartz introduced through his Manifesto were effective in incentivizing others to take up the mantle of the open access (OA) movement. Today, many sites that once used paywalls are freely available thanks to the actions of OA activists following in Swartz's footsteps. One such activist, Alexandra Elbakyan, furthered Swartz's mission by developing an online repository she dubbed "Sci-Hub" that provides free access to over 74 million scientific journal articles. Swartz and Elbakyan are both identified as Guerilla Open Access (GOA) activists, specified as such due to the blatantly illegal practices they engage in. More general OA approaches prefer to advocate for the liberation of scholarly information through legal means, and thus tensions exist between OA and GOA activists in terms of the risks they are willing to take in the fight for open accessibility. Some critics of the GOA movement claim to support civil disobedience, but do not support the radical ideals of GOA activists. They believe the responsibility to change belongs to policy makers and scientists.

See also 
 Anna's Archive

References

External links 
 The GOAM on the Internet Archive

Open access projects
Open access (publishing)